Robert Leosdan Alfonso Acea (born November 11, 1986) is a Cuban professional boxer. He is best known for his victory at the 2007 Pan American games in the super heavyweight division.

Career
Alfonso beat Newfel Ouatah but lost to Russian Evgeny Romanov at the world junior championships 2004 (semifinal).

He was also defeated nationally by compatriot superstar Odlanier Solis twice in 2004 at 201 lbs and later went up to super heavy.

He became the Cuban #1 only after Solis (who had gone up in weight, too) defected and he beat veteran Michel López Núñez in the National Championships 2007 and 2008.

He immediately won a major title, in the Pan American Games in Rio, beating Brazilian Antônio Rogério Nogueira 4:0 in the semis and Colombian Oscar Rivas 8:4 in the finals .

He qualified for the 2008 Olympics by beating young American Michael Hunter jr. in the final of their qualifier 9:1.

He lost his first Olympic bout 3:5 to Ukrainian Vyacheslav Glazkov.

He immigrated to the United States in 2012 to begin his professional career. He fought out of Miami, Florida for three years achieving a professional record of 6-0 (2 KO). After his late manager Si Stern's passing in 2015, Robert went a full year without a fight.

He made a strong comeback on June 25, 2016 with a knockout against Charles Daughtry 0:24 seconds into the first round.

He went on to win 3 additional fights from July to September 2016, all by way of unanimous decision.

His winning continued into 2017 with a first-round TKO over Keith Thompson at the BJCC in Birmingham, Alabama on the undercard of Deontay Wilder vs. Gerald Washington on February 25.

His next win came on May 12, 2017 at the inaugural Alabama Boxing Hall of Fame show in Tuscaloosa, Alabama. He landed several big hits against opponent Roberto Santos (12-4) throughout the first and second rounds, causing Santos to forfeit at the end of the second round. This was the first stoppage of Santos's career as his four losses up to that point had come by unanimous decision.

Alfonso earned a shot at his first title fight on August 11, 2017. The planned opponent was Devon Vargas, the heavyweight that represented the U.S in the 2004 Summer Olympics. A few weeks out, Vargas broke his jaw, and Birmingham's Jason Bergman stepped in as the new opponent. The fight took place in Tuscaloosa, Alabama, and the winner was to take home the vacant USBA Southern Region Heavyweight Title sanctioned by the IBF. Robert emerged victorious by unanimous decision after a tough ten-round battle.

He finished the year with a six-round unanimous decision victory over opponent Ronny Hale in Alexandria, Louisiana.

He currently splits his training time between Dallas, TX, and Tuscaloosa, AL.

Professional boxing record

External links
 World juniors 2004
 sports-reference
 
 
 

Heavyweight boxers
Super-heavyweight boxers
1986 births
Boxers at the 2008 Summer Olympics
Living people
Olympic boxers of Cuba
Boxers from Havana
Cuban male boxers
Boxers at the 2007 Pan American Games
Pan American Games gold medalists for Cuba
Pan American Games medalists in boxing
Medalists at the 2007 Pan American Games